Our Lady of the Angels School was a Roman Catholic elementary and middle school located in the Humboldt Park section of Chicago, Illinois, United States. Some sources describe the school as "in Austin".

The school was operated by the Roman Catholic Archdiocese of Chicago and served as the parish school of the Our Lady of the Angels Church.

The school is best known for the fatal Our Lady of the Angels School fire, which occurred on December 1, 1958. The fire killed 92 students and 3 nuns and led to fire safety consciousness in private and public schools in the United States.

The first school building: history prior to the 1958 fire
Our Lady of the Angels was an elementary and middle school comprising kindergarten through eight grades. It was located at 909 North Avers Avenue in the Humboldt Park area on the West Side of Chicago, at the intersection of West Iowa Street. The school was located in a mostly Italian-American middle class community; the community held several second and third generation immigrant groups, including Italian Americans, Polish Americans, Irish Americans, and German Americans. Most members of the community were Roman Catholics.

The area was originally mostly Irish, but slowly became mostly Italian by 1958. The facility was part of a large Roman Catholic parish which also consisted of a church, rectory, convent of the Sisters of Charity of the Blessed Virgin Mary, and two other parish halls. The school was the educational home to approximately 1,600 students.

In 1903, a two-story parish school was built, with four classrooms on the first floor and a chapel and convent on the second. The school opened in September 1904, and in 1905, the second-floor chapel and convent was converted into two classrooms for the seventh and eighth grades. In 1910, a second two-story building was built north of the original structure, at 909 North Avers Avenue; this brick and timber-joist structure with a wooden interior was in the "Old English" architectural style, with a basement a half-story above the street, a church on the first floor and 12 classrooms on the first and second floors. From 1939, a large new church seating more than 1100 parishioners was built together with a three-story brick rectory. When the new buildings were completed in April 1941, the church on the first floor of the 1910 building was converted into classrooms and a new chapel was built in its basement. In 1953, a two-story annex was built, connecting the 1910 building, which became the north wing of the school, with the older 1903 building, which became the south wing.

Our Lady of the Angels School fire

A fire in the north wing of the school occurred on December 1, 1958.  It killed 92 students and 3 nuns and injured numerous others.  The entire building was demolished in 1959, and a new school opened on the same site in 1960.

The new school building
A new Our Lady of the Angels School, with an address of 3814 West Iowa Street, which was located on the south side of the building and used in order to distance the school from the fire, was constructed with the latest required fire safety standards, such as a sprinkler system.

Prior to the rebuilding, Our Lady of the Angels students attended various "replacement" schools to finish the school year while the new Our Lady of the Angels School was under construction.

Catholic schools that took some Our Lady of the Angels students include:
 Our Lady Help of Christians School (Since closed)
 Our Lady of Grace School 
 St. Peter Canisius School (Since closed)

Chicago Public Schools campuses that took some Our Lady of the Angels students include:
 Cameron School (Cameron has similar construction to the former Our Lady of Angels School)
 John Hay Elementary School
 Rezin Orr School (now Brian Piccolo Specialty School)

The modern three-story building with 32 classrooms plus a kindergarten opened in September, 1960. Donations from around the world helped to fund the new construction.

Demographic changes
Demographic changes in the population of the city’s west side began to reduce the number of students in the school during the 1970s. The cohesiveness of the parish weakened and many Catholic residents began to move to the northwest side of Chicago or to the western suburbs.

In 1989, the St. Francis of Assisi School merged into Our Lady of the Angels. In 1990 the Our Lady of the Angels church merged into the St. Francis of Assisi Church (at 932 North Kostner). The Our Lady of the Angels parish buildings closed as the parish staff moved to the Francis of Assisi Church location.

School closure
As a result of declining numbers of students, the Archdiocese of Chicago closed Our Lady of the Angels School, which held the address of 3814 West Iowa Street, once the Class of 1999 graduated. The final graduating class dedicated a historic marker and fire memorial within the school. Due to the conflict between church and state property, this religious statue and pedestal have since been removed to the Holy Family Church.

At first the Nuestra America Charter High School opened in the former Our Lady of the Angels building. Nuestra America closed in 2002. The building was subsequently leased to Galapagos Charter School until it also closed in June 2016, citing financial pressures.

Notes

References

External links

 Official Website of the Our Lady of the Angels School Fire
 St. Francis of Assisi-Our Lady of the Angels Church

School buildings completed in 1903
School buildings completed in 1910
School buildings completed in 1951
School buildings completed in 1960
Educational institutions disestablished in 1999
Former elementary schools in Illinois
Former middle schools in Illinois
Defunct private schools in Chicago
Catholic schools in Chicago
Defunct Catholic schools in the United States
Catholic elementary schools in Illinois
K–8 schools in Chicago
Private K–8 schools in the United States
Defunct schools in Illinois
1903 establishments in Illinois
1999 disestablishments in Illinois